

Events

January–March 
 January 4 – A military alliance is established between the French Third Republic and the Russian Empire.
 January 7 – William Kennedy Dickson receives a patent for motion picture film in the United States.
 January 9 – New England Telephone and Telegraph installs the first battery-operated telephone switchboard, in Lexington, Massachusetts.
 February 12
 French anarchist Émile Henry sets off a bomb in a Paris café, killing one person and wounding twenty.
 The barque Elisabeth Rickmers of Bremerhaven is wrecked at Haurvig, Denmark, but all crew and passengers are saved. 
 February 15  
 In Korea, peasant unrest erupts in the Donghak Peasant Revolution, a massive revolt of followers of the Donghak movement.  Both China and Japan send military forces, claiming to come to the ruling Joseon dynasty government's aid.
 At 04:51 GMT, French anarchist Martial Bourdin dies of an accidental detonation of his own bomb, next to the Royal Observatory, Greenwich, in London, England.
 February 17 – American outlaw John Wesley Hardin is released from prison.
 March 1 – The Local Government Act (coming into effect December 1894–January 1895) reforms local government in Britain, creating a system of urban and rural districts with elected councils, with elected parish councils in rural areas, and gives women, irrespective of marital status, the right to vote and stand in local (but not national) elections.
 March 2  – William Gladstone resigns as British Prime Minister. 
 March 12 – Coca-Cola is sold in bottles for the first time.
 March 21 – A syzygy of planets occurs, as Mercury transits the Sun as seen from Venus, and Mercury and Venus both transit the Sun as seen from Saturn, but no two of the transits are simultaneous.
 March 25 – Coxey's Army (of the unemployed), the first significant protest march in the United States, departs from Massillon, Ohio, for Washington, D.C.

April–June 
 April 11 – Britain establishes a protectorate over Uganda.
 April 16 – Manchester City Football Club is formed in England.
 April 21 –  A bituminous coal miners' strike closes mines across the central United States.
 April 23 (St. George's Day) – Howard Ruff founds the Royal Society of St George, to foster the love of England and to strengthen England and the Commonwealth, by spreading the knowledge of English history, traditions and ideals. 
 May – Third plague pandemic: Bubonic plague breaks out in the Tai Ping Shan area of Hong Kong (by the end of the year, the death toll is 2,552 people); it also breaks out this year in Canton.
 May 1
 Coxey's Army arrives in Washington; Coxey is arrested on the Capitol grounds.
 The May Day Riots (against unemployment) break out in Cleveland, Ohio.
 May 10 – Dimitri Tiomkin, Ukrainian-born composer (d. 1979)
 May 11 – Pullman Strike: Three thousand Pullman Palace Car Company factory workers go on a "wildcat" (without union approval) strike in Illinois.
 May 14
 A meteor shower is seen in southern France.
 Blackpool Tower is opened in Blackpool, England, as a visitor attraction.
 May 21 – The Manchester Ship Canal and Docks are opened by Queen Victoria, linking the previously landlocked English industrial city of Manchester to the Irish Sea.
 June 22 – Dahomey becomes a French colony.
 June 23 – The International Olympic Committee is founded at the Sorbonne, Paris, at the initiative of Baron Pierre de Coubertin.
 June 24 – Marie François Sadi Carnot, president of France, is assassinated.
 June 30 – The Tower Bridge in London opens for traffic.

July–September 
 July 4
 The short-lived Republic of Hawaii is proclaimed by Sanford B. Dole.
 The football club FC La Chaux-de-Fonds is founded in Switzerland.

 July 6 – A fire at the site of the 1893 World's Columbian Exposition in Chicago destroys most of the remaining buildings.
 July 16 – The United Kingdom and Japan sign the Anglo-Japanese Treaty, as the U.K. becomes the first of the Western nations to agree to give up its extraterritorial rights in Japan.
 July 22 – The Paris–Rouen Competition for Horseless Carriages, the first automobile competition, is held.
 August 1 – War is declared between the Qing Empire of China and the Empire of Japan, over their rival claims of influence on their common ally, the Joseon dynasty of Korea. The event marks the start of the First Sino-Japanese War.
 August 15 – Sante Geronimo Caserio is executed for the assassination of French President Carnot.
 August 31 – New Zealand enacts the world's first minimum wage law, to take effect on January 1, in the passage of the Industrial Conciliation and Arbitration Act of 1894.
 September 1 – Great Hinckley Fire: A forest fire in Hinckley, Minnesota, kills more than 450 people.
 September 4 – In New York City, 12,000 tailors strike against sweatshop working conditions.
 September 26 – The  and the schooner barge Ironton collide and sink in Lake Huron. While the crew of the Ohio is rescued, five of the other craft's seven-member crew, including the captain, are lost.

October–December 
 October 1  
Petrópolis becomes the capital of the state of Rio de Janeiro, until 1902. 
The Owl Club of Cape Town, South Africa, a dining club, has its first formal meeting.
 October 3 – Pomfret School is founded in Connecticut.
 October 15 – Dreyfus affair: French Army officer Alfred Dreyfus is arrested for spying.
 October 30 – Domenico Menegatti obtains a patent for a procedure to be applied in producing pandoro industrially.
 November 1
 Emperor Alexander III of Russia is succeeded by his son, Nicholas II.
 The first issue of Billboard magazine is published in Cincinnati, Ohio by William Donaldson and James Hennegan. Initially, it covers the advertising and bill posting industry, and is at the time known as Billboard Advertising.
 November 6 – Republicans win by a landslide in the United States House of Representatives elections, which sets the stage for the decisive presidential election of 1896.
 November 7 – The Masonic Grand Lodge de France is founded, splitting from the larger and older Grand Orient de France.
 November 21 – First Sino-Japanese War: Battle of Lushunkou – Japanese troops secure a decisive victory over the Chinese, capture the port city of Lüshunkou, and begin the Port Arthur massacre, in which more than 1,000 Chinese servicemen and civilians die.
 November 26 – Wedding of Nicholas II of Russia and Alix of Hesse in the Grand Church of the Winter Palace at Saint Petersburg.
 December 6 – Kate Chopin's feminist short story "The Story of an Hour" is first published, in the American magazine Vogue.
 December 18 – Women in South Australia become the first in Australia to gain the right to vote and the first in the world with the right to be elected to Parliament, taking effect from 1895, after decades of activism.
 December 21 – Mackenzie Bowell becomes Canada's fifth prime minister.
 December 22 – Dreyfus affair: French Army officer Alfred Dreyfus is convicted of treason.

Date unknown 
 Grace Kimmins founds the Guild of the Poor Brave Things in England, for the education of crippled boys.
 The National College of Music, London, is founded by the Moss family.
 In the U.S., the Society of Beaux-Arts Architects is founded.
 Oil is discovered on the Osage Indian reservation, making the Osage the "richest group of people in the world".
 Edward B. Marks and Joe Stern publish the waltz The Little Lost Child, promoting the playing of the waltz with slides projected by a magic lantern, the earliest version of music video known as the illustrated song.
 Chatham Episcopal Institute (modern-day Chatham Hall) is founded as an all-girls college-preparatory boarding school in Chatham, Virginia.
 Frederick W. Tamblyn founds the Tamblyn School of Penmanship, which later becomes Ziller of Kansas City, the oldest calligraphy studio still operating in the United States.
Spillers Records is founded in Cardiff, the world's oldest record shop still in operation.
 The Liga Femeilor Române, the first women's organisation in Romania, is founded.

Births

January–February

 January 1 – Satyendra Nath Bose, Indian physicist (d. 1974)
 January 3  
 Benito Canónico, Venezuelan composer (d. 1971)
 ZaSu Pitts, American actress (d. 1963)
 January 8
 Maximilian Kolbe, Polish friar and martyr (k. 1941 in Auschwitz concentration camp)
 Vilmos Tkálecz, Hungarian politician (d. 1950)
 January 11 – Alexander Hall, American film director, film editor and theatre actor (d. 1968)
 January 15 – José Bustamante y Rivero, Peruvian politician, diplomat and jurist, 78th President of Peru (d. 1989)
 January 20 – Walter Piston, American composer (d. 1976)
 January 21 – Geoffrey Street, Australian politician (d. 1940)
 January 30
 Sybil Cholmondeley, Marchioness of Cholmondeley, British aristocrat (d. 1989)
 King Boris III of Bulgaria (d. 1943)
 René Dorme, French World War I fighter ace (d. 1917)
 January 31
 Isham Jones, American bandleader (d. 1956)
 Percy Helton, American film, television actor (d. 1971)
 February 1
 John Ford, American film director (d. 1973)
 Dick Merrill, American aviation pioneer (d. 1982)
 February 3 – Norman Rockwell, American artist, illustrator (d. 1978)
 February 8
 Billy Bishop, Canadian World War I fighter ace (d. 1956)
 Ludwig Marcuse, German philosopher (d. 1971)
 February 10 
 Harold Macmillan, British Prime Minister (d. 1986)
 Mãe Menininha do Gantois, Brazilian spiritual leader (iyalorixá) (d. 1986)
 February 14 – Jack Benny, American actor, comedian (d. 1974)
 February 19 – Ilie Antonescu, Romanian general (d. 1974)
 February 22 – Enid Markey, American actress (d. 1981)
 February 25 – Meher Baba, Indian Avatar of the Age (d. 1969)
 February 26
 Wilhelm Bittrich, German Waffen SS general (d. 1979)
 Ernest N. Harmon, American general (d. 1979)
 February 28 – Ben Hecht, American playwright, film writer (d. 1964)

March–April

 March 7 – Marcel Déat, French politician (d. 1955)
 March 8 – Desiderio Alberto Arnaz II, Cuban politician (d. 1973)
 March 11 – Otto Grotewohl, East German Communist politician, 1st Prime Minister of the German Democratic Republic (d. 1964)
 March 14 – Osa Johnson, American adventurer, documentary filmmaker (d. 1953)
 March 16 – Stuart Buchanan, American actor (d. 1974)
 March 17 – Paul Green, novelist, Pulitzer Prize-winning playwright (d. 1981)
 March 19 – Moms Mabley, African-American comedian (d. 1975)
 March 20
 Hans Langsdorff, German naval officer (d. 1939)
 Amalie Sara Colquhoun, Australian landscape and portrait painter (d. 1974
 March 26 – May Farquharson, Jamaican social worker, birth control advocate, philanthropist, and reformer (d. 1992)
 March 27 – René Fonck, French World War I flying ace (d. 1953)
 March 30 – Nikolai P. Barabashov, Russian astronomer (d. 1971)
 April 5 – Chesney Allen, British entertainer (d. 1982)
 April 9 – Keiji Shibazaki, Japanese admiral (d. 1943)
 April 10
 Shri Ghanshyam Das Birla, Indian industrialist, Gandhian and educationalist (d. 1983)
 Ben Nicholson, English abstract artist (d. 1982)
 Archibald Roosevelt, American conservative political activist, son of President Theodore Roosevelt (d. 1979)
 April 12 – Francisco Craveiro Lopes, 12th President of Portugal (d. 1964)
 April 13 – Sir Arthur Fadden, Australian Prime Minister (d. 1973)
 April 15 – Bessie Smith, African-American blues singer (d. 1937)
 April 17 – Nikita Khrushchev, Soviet politician (d. 1971)
 April 26 – Rudolf Hess, German Nazi official (d. 1987)
 April 27 – Nicolas Slonimsky, Russian/American musicologist (d. 1995)
 April 30 – H.V. Evatt, Australian politician, judge (d. 1965)

May–June

 May 2 – Joseph Henry Woodger, British theoretical biologist (d. 1981)
 May 10 – Horia Macellariu, Romanian admiral (d. 1989)
 May 11 –  Martha Graham, American dancer, choreographer (d. 1991)
 May 13 – Ásgeir Ásgeirsson, 2nd President of Iceland (d. 1972)
 May 15 – Eddie Stumpf, American baseball player, manager and executive (d. 1978)
 May 16 –  Walter Yust, American encyclopædia editor (d. 1960)
 May 19 –  Heinz Ziegler, German general (d. 1972)
 May 20
 Estelle Taylor, American actress (d. 1958)
 Chandrashekarendra Saraswati, Indian religious scholar, saint (d. 1994)
 May 21 – Constantin Anton, Romanian general (d. 1993)
 May 26 – Paul Lukas, Hungarian actor (d. 1971)
 May 27
 Louis-Ferdinand Céline, French writer (d. 1961)
 Dashiell Hammett, American detective fiction writer (d. 1961)
 May 29 – Josef von Sternberg, Austrian-American film director (d. 1969)
 May 30 – Hubertus van Mook, Acting Governor-General of the Dutch East Indies (1942-1948) (d. 1965)
 May 31 – Fred Allen, American comedian (d. 1956)
 June 4 – Gabriel Pascal, Hungarian film producer (d. 1954)
 June 5 
 Mihail Corbuleanu, Romanian general (d. 1973)
 Roy Thomson, Canadian publisher (d. 1976)
 June 9 – Nedo Nadi, Italian fencer (d. 1940)
 June 14 
 Marie-Adélaïde, Grand Duchess of Luxembourg (d. 1924)
 W. W. E. Ross, Canadian geophysicist, poet (d. 1966)
 June 23
 King Edward VIII of the United Kingdom (afterwards The Duke of Windsor) (d. 1972)
 Harold Barrowclough, New Zealand general, lawyer and chief justice (d. 1972)
 Alfred Kinsey, American sexologist (d. 1956)
 June 28
 Arthur D. Struble, American admiral (d. 1983)
 Lois Wilson, American actress (d. 1988)
 Francis Hunter, American tennis player (d. 1981)

July–August 

 July 5 – Margarita Nelken, Spanish politician (d. 1968)
 July 8
 Carlo Ludovico Bragaglia, Italian film director (d. 1998)
 Pyotr Kapitsa, Russian physicist, Nobel Prize laureate (d. 1984)
 July 9 – Phelps Putnam, American poet (d. 1948)
 July 17 – Georges Lemaître, Belgian physicist, astronomer (d. 1966)
 July 18 – Mariano Rossell y Arellano, Guatemalan Roman Catholic clergyman (d. 1964)
 July 19 
 Jerzy Pajączkowski-Dydyński, British-based Polish veteran of World War I  (d. 2005)
 Khawaja Nazimuddin, Pakistani Prime Minister (d. 1964)
 July 20 – Wiley Blount Rutledge, Associate Justice of the Supreme Court of the United States (d. 1949)
 July 22 – María Sabina, Mexican curandera (d. 1985)
 July 25 – Walter Brennan, American actor (d. 1974)
 July 26 – Aldous Huxley, English novelist (d. 1963)
 August 1
 Benjamin Mays, American Baptist minister and civil rights leader (d. 1984)
 Kurt Wintgens, German fighter pilot, air ace in World War I (d. 1916)
 August 2 – Bertha Lutz, Brazilian zoologist, politician, diplomat and feminist (d. 1976)
 August 3 – Harry Heilmann, American baseball player (d. 1951)
 August 9 – Kathleen Lockhart, British-American actress (d. 1978)
 August 10  
V. V. Giri, Indian politician, 4th President of India (d. 1980)
Alan Crosland, American film director (d. 1936)
 August 16 – George Meany, American labor leader (d. 1980)
 August 26 – Maksim Purkayev, Soviet general (d. 1953)
 August 28
 Karl Böhm, Austrian conductor (d. 1981)
 Elisha Scott, Irish footballer (d. 1959)

September–October

 September 2 – Joseph Roth, Austrian writer (d. 1939)
 September 3 – Benigno Aquino Sr., Filipino politician (d. 1947)
 September 6 – Howard Pease, American adventure novelist (d. 1974)
 September 7 – George Waggner, American film director, producer and actor (d. 1984)
 September 12
 Billy Gilbert, American actor and comedian (d. 1971)
 Dorothy Maud Wrinch, British mathematician and biochemical theorist (d. 1976)
 September 13
 J. B. Priestley, English novelist, playwright (d. 1984)
 Julian Tuwim, Polish poet (d. 1953)
 September 15 – Jean Renoir, French film director (d. 1979)
 September 19 – Raymond Duval, French general (d. 1955)
 September 21 – Anton Piëch, Austrian lawyer, son-in-law of Ferdinand Porsche (d. 1952)
 September 22 – Louis Bennett Jr., American World War I flying ace (d. 1918)
 September 24
 Tommy Armour, Scottish golfer (d. 1968)
 Harry B. Liversedge, American general (d. 1951)
 Billy Bletcher,  American actor (d. 1979)
 September 27 – Lothar von Richthofen, German World War I fighter ace (d. 1922)
 October 2 – Thomas L. Sprague, American admiral (d. 1972)
 October 5 – Bevil Rudd, South African athlete (d. 1948)
 October 7 – Herman Dooyeweerd, Dutch philosopher and professor of law (d. 1977)
 October 7 – Del Lord, American film director (d. 1970)
 October 14 – E. E. Cummings, American poet (d. 1962)
 October 14 – Heinrich Lübke, German president (d. 1972)
 October 15 – Moshe Sharett, Israeli Prime Minister (d. 1965)
 October 18 – H. L. Davis, American fiction writer (d. 1960)
 October 24 – Platon Chirnoagă, Romanian general (d. 1974)
 October 25
 Claude Cahun, French photographer, writer (d. 1954)
 Âşık Veysel Şatıroğlu, Turkish poet, songwriter and saz player (d. 1973)
 October 27 – Fritz Sauckel, German Nazi politician, war criminal (d. 1946)
 October 30 – Peter Warlock, English composer (d. 1930)

November–December

 November 2 – Alexander Lippisch, German aerodynamics engineer (d. 1976)
 November 3 – Sofoklis Venizelos, 3-time prime minister of Greece (d. 1964)
 November 4 – Chafik Charobim, Egyptian impressionist painter (d. 1975)
 November 5
 Jan Garber, American jazz bandleader (d. 1977)
 Harold Innis, Canadian communications scholar (d. 1952)
 Beardsley Ruml, American economist, tax plan author (d. 1960)
 November 8 – Claude Beck, American cardiac surgeon (1971) 
 November 9 – Mae Marsh, American film actress (d. 1968)
 November 13 – Nita Naldi, American film actress (d. 1961)
 November 14 – Rino Corso Fougier, Italian air force general (d. 1963)
 November 19
Wacław Stachiewicz, Polish writer, geologist, and general (d. 1973)
Américo Tomás, 13th President of Portugal (d. 1987)
 November 21
Corinne Griffith, American actress, author (d. 1979)
Cecil M. Harden, American politician (d. 1984)
 November 24 – Herbert Sutcliffe, English cricketer (d. 1978)
 November 26 – Norbert Wiener, American mathematician (d. 1964)
 November 27 – Konosuke Matsushita, Japanese industrialist (d. 1989)
 November 29 – Lucille Hegamin, American singer, entertainer (d. 1970)
 December 3 – Deiva Zivarattinam, Indian politician (d. 1975)
 December 5
 Charles Robberts Swart, 1st State President of South Africa (d. 1982)
 Philip K. Wrigley, American business, sports executive (d. 1977)
 December 7 – Freddie Adkins, British cartoonist (d. c. 1986)
 December 8
 E. C. Segar, American cartoonist, creator of Popeye (d. 1938)
 James Thurber, American cartoonist, writer (d. 1961)
 Florbela Espanca, Portuguese poet (d. 1930)
 December 10
William Sydney Marchant, British colonial official (d. 1953)
Edward Milford, Australian general (d. 1972)
 December 15 – Felix Stump, American admiral (d. 1972)
 December 17
 Arthur Fiedler, American conductor (d. 1979)
 Willem Schermerhorn, Prime Minister of the Netherlands (d. 1977)
 December 20 – Sir Robert Menzies, 12th Prime Minister of Australia (d. 1978)
 December 22 – Edwin Linkomies, Finnish Prime Minister (d. 1963)
 December 23 – Arthur Gilligan, English cricket captain (d. 1976)
 December 24 – Georges Guynemer, French World War I fighter ace (d. 1917)
 December 26 – Jean Toomer, American poet (d. 1967)

Date unknown
 Tawfik Abu Al-Huda, 4-Time Prime Minister of Jordan (d. 1956)
 Constantin Constantiniu, Romanian general (d. 1971)
 Demetrio Galán Bergua, Spanish physician, humanist and journalist (d. 1970)
 Riad Al Solh, 2-Time Prime Minister of Lebanon (d. 1951)
 Shah Abd al-Wahhab, Bangladeshi Islamic scholar (d. 1982)

Deaths

January–June 

 January 1 – Heinrich Hertz, German physicist (b. 1857)
 January 13 – Nadezhda von Meck, Russian patron of Peter Tchaikovsky (b. 1831)
 January 20 – Robert Halpin, Irish mariner and transoceanic cable layer (b. 1836)
 January 28 – Elise Hwasser, Swedish actress (b. 1831)
 February 4 – Adolphe Sax, Belgian instrument maker, inventor of the saxophone (b. 1814)
 February 5 – Auguste Vaillant, French anarchist (b. 1861) (executed)
 February 6 –  Maria Deraismes, French feminist (b. 1828)
 February 8 – Robert Michael Ballantyne, Scottish novelist (b. 1825)
 February 11 – Margaret Henley, English inspiration for the name Wendy in Peter Pan (b. 1888)
 February 12 – Hans von Bülow, German conductor, pianist and composer (b. 1830)
 February 14 – Myra Bradwell, American lawyer, political activist,  (b. 1831)
John T. Ford, American theatre manager (b. 1829)
 February 15 – May Brookyn, American actress (b. 1854/1859)
 February 21 – Gustave Caillebotte, French painter (b. 1848)
 February 27
 Hilarión Daza, President of Bolivia (assassinated) (b. 1840)
 Carl Schmidt, Baltic German chemist (b. 1822)
 March 2 
 Jubal Early, American Confederate general (b. 1816)
 William H. Osborn, American railroad executive (b. 1820)
 March 3 – Ned Williamson, American baseball player (b. 1857)
 March 20 – Lajos Kossuth, Hungarian politician (b. 1802)
 March 30 – Jane Goodwin Austin, American popular story writer (b. 1831)
 April 1 – Remigio Morales Bermúdez, 19th President of Peru (b. 1836)
 April 8 – Bankim Chandra Chatterjee, Bengali poet (b. 1838)
 May 12 – Grand Duchess Catherine Mikhailovna of Russia, granddaughter of  Tsar Paul I (b. 1827)
 May 19 – Caroline Mehitable Fisher Sawyer, American biographier (b. 1812)
 June 3 – Karl Eduard Zachariae von Lingenthal, German jurist, expert on Byzantine law (b. 1812)
 June 7 – King Hassan I of Morocco (b. 1836)
 June 8 –William M. Dalton, American Old West outlaw (b. 1866)
 June 23
 Marietta Alboni, Italian opera singer (b. 1826)
 Władysław Czartoryski, Polish political activist and art collector (b. 1828)
 July 24 – George Peter Alexander Healy, American portrait painter (b. 1813)
 June 25 
 Marie François Sadi Carnot, French statesman (assassinated) (b. 1837)
 Charles Romley Alder Wright, British chemist who synthesized heroin (b. 1844)
 June 27 – Giorgio Costantino Schinas, Maltese architect and civil engineer (b. 1834)

July–December 

 July 1 – Julius van Zuylen van Nijevelt, Prime Minister of the Netherlands (b. 1819)
 July 22 – Julius von Bose, Prussian general (b. 1809)
 July 30 – Walter Pater, English essayist, critic (b. 1839)
 August 1 - Joseph Holt, Union Army general (b. 1807)
 September 1 – Nathaniel P. Banks, American politician, general (b. 1816)
 September 3 – Josiah Parsons Cooke, American scientist (b. 1827)
 September 8 – Hermann von Helmholtz, German physician, physicist  (b. 1821)
 September 13 – Emmanuel Chabrier, French composer (b. 1841)
 September 24 – Mary Jane Patterson, first African-American woman to receive a B.A degree in 1862. (b. 1840)
 October 7 – Oliver Wendell Holmes, Sr., American author (b. 1809)
 October 9 – Henry Grey, 3rd Earl Grey, British politician (b. 1802)
 October 20 – James Anthony Froude, English historian (b. 1818)
 October 22 – Gillis Bildt, 5th Prime Minister of Sweden (b. 1820)
 October 25 – Mary Brayton Woodbridge, American temperance reformer and newspaper editor (b. 1830)
 October 30 – Juan Cortina, Mexican folk hero (b. 1824)
 November 1 – Emperor Alexander III of Russia (b. 1845)
 November 20 – Anton Rubinstein, Russian pianist, composer (b. 1829)
 November 25 – Solomon Caesar Malan, Swiss-born orientalist (b. 1812)
 November 29 – Juan N. Méndez, interim President of Mexico from 1876 to 1877. (b. 1820)
 December 3 – Robert Louis Stevenson, Scottish author (b. 1850)
 December 8 – Pafnuty Chebyshev, Russian mathematician (b. 1821)
 December 9 – Mary Bell Smith, American educator, social reformer, and writer (b. 1818)
 December 12 – Sir John Thompson, 4th Prime Minister of Canada (b. 1845)
 December 28 – Chamarajendra Wadiyar X, Maharajah of Mysore (b. 1863)
 December 29 – Christina Rossetti, English poet (b. 1830)

Date unknown
 Cynthia Roberts Gorton, blind American poet and author (b. 1826)
 Paul Lecreux, French sculptor (b. c. 1826)

References

Sources
 American Annual Cyclopedia...1894 (1895) online